The Sultanah Bahiyah Highway (Malay: Lebuhraya Sultanah Bahiyah), Federal Route 255 (formerly Alor Setar Bypass and Jalan Sultanah, both Kedah State Route K139) is a major highway bypass in Alor Star, Kedah, Malaysia. It was named after the late Sultanah Bahiyah, a first consort of Sultan Abdul Halim of Kedah. The Kilometre Zero is located at Alor Setar North.

History
In November 2003, after a first consort of Sultan Abdul Halim of Kedah, Sultanah Bahiyah, died on 26 August 2003, the Kedah state government renamed the highway Sultanah Bahiyah Highway in her honour.

In 2013, the highway was gazetted as Federal Route 255.

Features
At most sections, the Federal Route 255 was built under the JKR R5 road standard, with a speed limit of 90 km/h.

List of junctions

References

Highways in Malaysia
Alor Setar Ring Road
Malaysian Federal Roads